Klenčí pod Čerchovem (until 1946 Kleneč pod Čerchovem) is a market town in Domažlice District in the Plzeň Region of the Czech Republic. It has about 1,300 inhabitants. The historic centre is well preserved and is protected by law as a village monument zone.

Administrative parts
Villages of Capartice, Černá Řeka and Jindřichova Hora are administrative parts of Klenčí pod Čerchovem.

Geography
It lies mostly in the Upper Palatine Forest. The mountain of Čerchov, involved in the market town's name, is located south of the market town outside the municipal territory. A notable body of water is the Klenečský pond, located in the northeastern part of Klenčí pod Čerchovem.

History
Klenčí was founded in 1325 by Chodové. In the second half of the 16th century, the settlement grew and became a market town.

Sights
The centre of Klenčí pod Čerchovem is known for preserved examples of folk architecture. The landmark is the Church of Saint Martin, built in the Baroque style in 1737–1745.

Notable people
Jindřich Šimon Baar (1869–1925), Catholic priest and writer

Twin towns – sister cities

Klenčí pod Čerchovem is twinned with:
 Dürrenroth, Switzerland
 Herent, Belgium
 Kleneč, Czech Republic
 Waldmünchen, Germany

References

External links

Populated places in Domažlice District
Market towns in the Czech Republic
Chodové